Disks large homolog 3 (DLG3) also known as neuroendocrine-DLG or synapse-associated protein 102 (SAP-102) is a protein that in humans is encoded by the DLG3 gene. DLG3 is a member of the membrane-associated guanylate kinase (MAGUK) superfamily of proteins.

Interactions
DLG3 has been shown to interact with:

 APC, 
 CRIPT, 
 DLG4, 
 EXOC3,
 EXOC4, 
 GRIN2A, 
 GRIN2B, 
 GRIN2C, 
 KCNJ12 
 PTK2B,  and
 SYNGAP1.

Model organisms
Model organisms have been used in the study of DLG3 function. A conditional knockout mouse line called Dlg3tm1a(EUCOMM)Wtsi was generated at the Wellcome Trust Sanger Institute. Male and female animals underwent a standardized phenotypic screen to determine the effects of deletion. Additional screens performed: - In-depth immunological phenotyping

References

Further reading